Chad Prather (born December 9, 1972) is an American conservative political commentator, comedian and Internet personality known for a series of YouTube videos in which he comments on life, right-leaning politics and current events. His video "Unapologetically Southern" went viral in 2015. He currently hosts The Chad Prather Show on BlazeTV. Prather ran for Governor of Texas against incumbent Greg Abbott in the 2022 Republican gubernatorial primary, but was eliminated in the primary on March 1, 2022.

Early life and education 
Prather was born in New Jersey. He grew up in Augusta, Georgia, where he attended Westside High School. Prather graduated from high school in 1991 and then attended the University of Georgia. He earned a bachelor's degree in communications and a master's degree from Columbia International University.

Career 
In 2013 Prather was approached by fledgling television network Ride TV about potentially hosting a humor, travel show called "It's My Backyard". While working on the show Prather began to use social media outlets to promote the program. He is best known for his viral YouTube video "Unapologetically Southern," which was featured on Fox News and in Country Living. Prather has also appeared in other media outlets including Fox and Friends, MSN, CNN and Nash Country Weekly. Prather has been referred to as an armchair philosopher. He often wears a cowboy hat and speaks to the camera from the cab of his truck.

In 2016, Chad Prather and Fort Worth, Texas comedian Cowboy Bill Martin teamed up to begin the Kings of Cowtown World Comedy Tour. In 2017, working with Steve McGrew, Prather released the satirical song "I've Got Friends in Safe Spaces", based on Garth Brooks' hit "Friends in Low Places", about progressive college students immuring themselves in safe spaces.

Prather also hosts "The Chad Prather Show" on BlazeTV.

Political career 
In 2020, Prather announced his candidacy for the 2022 Texas gubernatorial election in reaction to incumbent Governor Greg Abbott's policy of mandating face coverings throughout his state amid the COVID-19 pandemic in Texas. Prather included "pro-life", "pro-gun", and promised to "defend First Amendment speech rights against those in academia, big tech media organizations and politics who seek to silence conservatives" on his weekly podcast on Blaze Radio Network. Prather has stated that he believes the issue of Texas secession from the United States should be put on the ballot for voters to decide.

References

External links
Chad Prather Official Website 

Living people
People from Ramsey, New Jersey
Male actors from Augusta, Georgia
American male stage actors
American television hosts
American podcasters
1972 births
Blaze Media people
YouTube channels launched in 2018
News YouTubers
Commentary YouTubers
American male comedians
Comedians from New Jersey
Comedians from Georgia (U.S. state)
21st-century American comedians
21st-century American male actors
YouTube podcasters